HGX may stand for:

 Nvidia HGX, an AI computer by Nvidia
 IBM 3477/3487 model HGX, a historic terminal computer from IBM with a green display
 HGX, a container wagon class in New Zealand